Isocitrate dehydrogenase 1 (NADP+), soluble is an enzyme that in humans is encoded by the IDH1 gene on chromosome 2. Isocitrate dehydrogenases catalyze the oxidative decarboxylation of isocitrate to 2-oxoglutarate. These enzymes belong to two distinct subclasses, one of which uses NAD+ as the electron acceptor and the other NADP+. Five isocitrate dehydrogenases have been reported: three NAD+-dependent isocitrate dehydrogenases, which localize to the mitochondrial matrix, and two NADP+-dependent isocitrate dehydrogenases, one of which is mitochondrial and the other predominantly cytosolic. Each NADP+-dependent isozyme is a homodimer. The protein encoded by this gene is the NADP+-dependent isocitrate dehydrogenase found in the cytoplasm and peroxisomes. It contains the PTS-1 peroxisomal targeting signal sequence. The presence of this enzyme in peroxisomes suggests roles in the regeneration of NADPH for intraperoxisomal reductions, such as the conversion of 2,4-dienoyl-CoAs to 3-enoyl-CoAs, as well as in peroxisomal reactions that consume 2-oxoglutarate, namely the alpha-hydroxylation of phytanic acid. The cytoplasmic enzyme serves a significant role in cytoplasmic NADPH production. Alternatively spliced transcript variants encoding the same protein have been found for this gene. [provided by RefSeq, Sep 2013]

Structure 

IDH1 is one of three isocitrate dehydrogenase isozymes, the other two being IDH2 and IDH3, and encoded by one of five isocitrate dehydrogenase genes, which are IDH1, IDH2, IDH3A, IDH3B, and IDH3G.

IDH1 forms an asymmetric homodimer in the cytoplasm and carries out its function through two hydrophilic active sites formed by both protein subunits. Each subunit or monomer is composed of three domains: a large domain (residues 1–103 and 286–414), a small domain (residues 104–136 and 186–285), and a clasp domain (residues 137 to 185). The large domain contains a Rossmann fold, while the small domain forms an α/β sandwich structure, and the clasp domain folds as two stacked double-stranded anti-parallel β-sheets. A β-sheet joins the large and small domains and is flanked by two clefts on opposite sides. The deep cleft, also known as the active site, is formed by the large and small domains of one subunit and a small domain of the other subunit. This active site includes the NADP-binding site and the isocitrate-metal ion-binding site. The shallow cleft, also referred to as the back cleft, is formed by both domains of one subunit and participates in the conformational changes of homodimeric IDH1. Finally, the clasp domains of both subunits intertwine to form a double layer of four-stranded anti-parallel β-sheets linking together the two subunits and the two active sites.

Furthermore, conformational changes to the subunits and a conserved structure at the active site affect the activity of the enzyme. In its open, inactive form, the active site structure forms a loop while one subunit adopts an asymmetric open conformation and the other adopts a quasi-open conformation. This conformation enables isocitrate to bind the active site, inducing a closed conformation that also activates IDH1. In its closed, inactive form, the active site structure becomes an α-helix that can chelate metal ions. An intermediate, semi-open form features this active site structure as a partially unraveled α-helix.

There is also a type 1 peroxisomal targeting sequence at its C-terminal that targets the protein to the peroxisome.

Function 
As an isocitrate dehydrogenase, IDH1 catalyzes the reversible oxidative decarboxylation of isocitrate to yield α-ketoglutarate (α-KG) as part of the TCA cycle in glucose metabolism. This step also allows for the concomitant reduction of nicotinamide adenine dinucleotide phosphate (NADP+) to reduced nicotinamide adenine dinucleotide phosphate (NADPH). Since NADPH and α-KG function in cellular detoxification processes in response to oxidative stress, IDH1 also indirectly participates in mitigating oxidative damage. In addition, IDH1 is key to β-oxidation of unsaturated fatty acids in the peroxisomes of liver cells. IDH1 also participates in the regulation of glucose-induced insulin secretion. Notably, IDH1 is the primary producer of NADPH in most tissues, especially in brain. Within cells, IDH1 has been observed to localize to the cytoplasm, peroxisome, and endoplasmic reticulum.

Under hypoxic conditions, IDH1 catalyzes the reverse reaction of α-KG to isocitrate, which contributes to citrate production via glutaminolysis. Isocitrate can also be converted into acetyl-CoA for lipid metabolism.

Mutation 

IDH1 mutations are heterozygous, typically involving an amino acid substitution in the active site of the enzyme in codon 132. The mutation results in a loss of normal enzymatic function and the abnormal production of 2-hydroxyglutarate (2-HG). It has been considered to take place due to a change in the binding site of the enzyme. 2-HG has been found to inhibit enzymatic function of many alpha-ketoglutarate dependent dioxygenases, including histone and DNA demethylases, causing widespread changes in histone and DNA methylation and potentially promoting tumorigenesis.

Clinical significance 

Mutations in this gene have been shown to cause metaphyseal chondromatosis with aciduria.

Mutations in IDH1 are also implicated in cancer. Originally, mutations in IDH1 were detected in an integrated genomic analysis of human glioblastoma multiforme. Since then it has become clear that mutations in IDH1 and its homologue IDH2 are among the most frequent mutations in diffuse gliomas, including diffuse astrocytoma, anaplastic astrocytoma, oligodendroglioma, anaplastic oligodendroglioma, oligoastrocytoma, anaplastic oligoastrocytoma, and secondary glioblastoma. Mutations in IDH1 are often the first hit in the development of diffuse gliomas, suggesting IDH1 mutations as key events in the formation of these brain tumors. Glioblastomas with a wild-type IDH1 gene have a median overall survival of only 1 year, whereas IDH1-mutated glioblastoma patients have a median overall survival of over 2 years. Tumors of various tissue types with IDH1/2 mutations show improved responses to radiation and chemotherapy. The best-studied mutation in IDH1 is R132H, which has been show to act as a tumor suppressor.

In addition to being mutated in diffuse gliomas, IDH1 has also been shown to harbor mutations in human acute myeloid leukemia.

The IDH1 mutation is considered a driver alteration and occurs early during tumorigenesis, in specific in glioma and glioblastoma multiforme, its possible use as a new tumour-specific antigen to induce antitumor immunity for the cancer treatment has recently been prompted. A tumour vaccine can stimulate the body’s immune system, upon exposure to a tumour-specific peptide antigen, by activation or amplification of a humoral and cytotoxic immune response targeted at the specific cancer cells.

The study of Schumacher et al. has been shown that this attractive target (the mutation in the isocitrate dehydrogenase 1) from an immunological perspective represents a potential tumour-specific neoantigen with high uniformity and penetrance and could be exploited by immunotherapy through vaccination. Accordingly, some patients with IDH1-mutated gliomas demonstrated spontaneous peripheral CD4+ T-cell responses against the mutated IDH1 region with generation B-cell producing antibodies. Vaccination of MHC-humanized transgenic mice with mutant IDH1 peptide induced an IFN-γ CD4+ T-helper 1 cell response, indicating an endogenous processing through MHC class II, and production of antibodies targeting mutant IDH1. Tumour vaccination, both prophylactic and therapeutic, resulted in growth suppression of transplanted IDH1-expressing sarcomas in MHC-humanized mice. This in vivo data shows a specific and potent immunologic response in both transplanted and existing tumours.

As a drug target
Mutated and normal forms of IDH1 had been studied for drug inhibition both in silico and in vitro, and some drugs are being developed (e.g.  Ivosidenib). Ivosidenib was approved by the FDA in July 2018 for relapsed or refractory acute myeloid leukemia (AML) with an IDH1 mutation. Ivosidenib (AG-120) has exhibited potent anti-wtIDH1 properties in melanoma under low magnesium and nutrient levels, reflective of the tumor microenvironment in natura.

References

Further reading 
 
 
 
 
 
 
 
 
 
 

EC 1.1.1